Lily, Lilium, is a genus of flowering plants with large flowers.

Lily may also refer to:

 List of plants known as lily

Arts and entertainment

Film and television
 The Lily (film), a 1926 American drama 
 Lily (1973 special), an American television special
 "Lily" (Once Upon a Time), a 2015 episode from the TV series 
 "Lily", a 1994 episode of the TV series Diagnosis Murder
 Lily: A Longitudinal View of Life with Down Syndrome, a 3-part TV documentary
 Lily, aime-moi, a 1975 French film 
  Lily van der Woodsen, a character in Gossip Girl
 Poison Ivy II: Lily, a 1996 thriller film

Literature
 "The Lilly" (poem), a 1794 poem by English poet William Blake, about the flower
 The Lily (newspaper) (1849–1853), the first U.S. newspaper edited by and for women
 The Lily (Washington Post), a publication of the Washington Post

Music
 Lily (Wendy Matthews album), 1992
 Lily (Christy Moore album), 2016
 "L.I.L.Y. (Like I Love You)", a 2008 single by Belgian singer Kate Ryan
 "Lily", a 2018 song by Alan Walker featuring K-391 and Emelie Hollow

People
 Lily (name), a feminine given name
 Lily (Japanese singer) (1952–2016)
 Lily Morrow, member of K-Pop group Nmixx under the stage name Lily

Places
 Lily, Kentucky, U.S.
 Lily, South Dakota, U.S.
 Lily, Wisconsin, U.S.
 Lily Bay, a bay in Maine, U.S.
 The Lily, Stirling Range, a windmill in Western Australia

Ships
 , the name of several Royal Navy ships
 PS Lily (1880), a British paddle steamer passenger vessel 
 USS Lily (1862), a Union Navy steam tugboat during the American Civil War
 Lily (HBC vessel), operated by the HBC from 1877-1883, see Hudson's Bay Company vessels

Other uses
 Lily (software), a female vocal originally released for Vocaloid 2
 Kawasaki Ki-48, a Japanese World War II light bomber named "Lily" by the Allies
 Fleur-de-lis, a stylised lily

See also

 Lili (disambiguation)
 Lilies (disambiguation)
 Lilium (disambiguation)
 Lille (disambiguation)
 Lilley (disambiguation)
 Lilli (disambiguation)
 Lillie (disambiguation)
 Lilly (disambiguation)
 Lily Lake (disambiguation)
 Lily Pond (disambiguation)
 Easter lily (disambiguation)
 Gilded Lily (disambiguation)
 Hurricane Lily (disambiguation)
 Princess Lily (disambiguation)